Samedov is an Azerbaijani surname. Notable people with the surname include:

 Aleksandr Samedov (born 1984), Russian footballer
 Alihan Samedov (born 1964), Soviet and Azerbaijani musician
 Zabit Samedov (born 1984), Azerbaijani kickboxer

Azerbaijani-language surnames